James A. Finch Jr. (November 13, 1907 – April 1, 1988) was a judge on the Missouri Supreme Court from 1965 until 1978, and the chief justice of that same court from 1971 to 1973. He attended public schools in Fornfelt and New Madrid, Missouri and graduated from the University of Missouri in Columbia. He served as a major in the U.S. Army Air Corps between 1942 and 1945.

References

1907 births
1988 deaths
Chief Justices of the Supreme Court of Missouri
People from New Madrid, Missouri
University of Missouri alumni
University of Missouri School of Law alumni
Southeast Missouri State University alumni
20th-century American judges
Judges of the Supreme Court of Missouri